Pierre Bleuse (born 6 November 1977) is a French violinist and conductor.

Biography
Bleuse was born in Boulogne-Billancourt into a family of musicians: his father Marc Bleuse is a composer, his mother Anne Fondeville is an opera singer, his brother Emmanuel is a cellist and his sister Jeanne is a pianist. Bleuse began his musical studies on violin at the Conservatoire de Boulogne-Billancourt in the classes of Jean Lenert and Suzanne Gessner. He continued his studies at the Conservatoire national de région in Toulouse in the classes of Pierre Doukan and Guenadi Hoffmann from 1990. He obtained his violin and chamber music prizes in 1994. He then returned to Paris and entered the Conservatoire de Paris in the class of Patrice Fontanarosa. He graduated with a 1st prize in 2002, and studied further at the Berlin University of the Arts.

After his studies, Bleuse became a member of the Satie Quartet and the ensembles Court-Circuit and TM+. He was concertmaster and associate conductor of the Toulouse Chamber Orchestra from 2000 to 2010. He also studied baroque violin with Gilles Colliard.

In 2010, Bleuse decided to turn to conducting. He studied with Jorma Panula in Finland, and continued his conducting studies with Laurent Gay at the Geneva University of Music in 2011. After he graduated in 2013, he became assistant to Gay.

From 2012, Bleuse began regular collaboration with the Orchestre National du Capitole de Toulouse. He has also worked as an assistant at the Opéra de Lyon from 2017, notably in the production of Orfeo ed Euridice, directed by David Morten. After being spotted by Thierry Fischer in 2014 at the Mozarteum University Salzburg, he was invited for his U.S. debut to conduct the Utah Symphony in Salt Lake City in July 2016.

Bleuse co-founded the Lemanic Modern Ensemble for contemporary repertoire, and has served as its co-music director. Michael Jarrell entrusted him in January 2017 with conducting the ensemble in his opera Cassandre, starring Fanny Ardant, performed at the Grand Théâtre de Provence. His close relationship with Jarrell led him to conduct his anniversary concert in October 2018 at the Victoria Hall in Geneva, with the Lemanic Modern Ensemble and the Orchestre de la Suisse Romande. the Orchestre de chambre de Paris, the Orchestre de Paris, Orchestre symphonique et lyrique de Nancy, the Orchestre de l'Opéra de Tours, and the Orchestre national d’Auvergne. 

Bleuse was a co-founder and is artistic director of the Musika Orchestra Academy, a European school of orchestral studies.  Bleuse became chief conductor of the Odense Symphony Orchestra in 2021.  In December 2021, the Ensemble intercontemporain announced the appointment of Bleuse as its next music director, effective with the 2023-2024 season, with an initial contract of 4 years.

References

External links

 
 Pierre Bleuse Musika Orchestra Academy
 Pierre Bleuse Operabase

Male conductors (music)
1977 births
Conservatoire de Paris alumni
Living people
People from Boulogne-Billancourt
20th-century French male musicians
20th-century French musicians
20th-century classical violinists
21st-century French male musicians
21st-century French conductors (music)
21st-century classical violinists
Berlin University of the Arts alumni